Ceinture 21 to 35 were a class of fifteen French  locomotives of the Syndicat d'Exploitation des Chemins de fer de Ceinture de Paris. built in 1899 for pulling suburban passenger trains.

The locomotives were built in 1899 by the Chemins de fer du Nord's Hellemmes and La Chapelles Workshops based on the design of the Chemins de fer de l'Ouest's 3501 to 3602 series (later État 30–101 to 30-202).

The Nord made several changes: the use of a Belpaire firebox, higher boiler pressure, Adams safety valves, smaller driving wheels and Nord-type sandboxes.

In 1934 at the dissolution of the Syndicat they passed to the Nord who renumbered them 3.901 to 3.915. Six were scrapped in 1936, leaving nine to pass to the SNCF at nationalisation in 1938. The SNCF renumbered them 2-030.TB.1 to 2–030.TB.9.

The remaining locomotives were scrapped between 1939 and 1953. None were preserved.

References

Steam locomotives of France
0-6-0T locomotives
Railway locomotives introduced in 1899
Passenger locomotives
Scrapped locomotives